Miljanovci is a village in the municipalities of Usora and Tešanj, Bosnia and Herzegovina.

Demographics 
According to the 2013 census, its population was 817, with 797 living in the Tešanj part, none living in the Doboj partand 20 living in the Usora part.

References

Villages in Republika Srpska
Populated places in Doboj
Populated places in Tešanj
Populated places in Usora